Svyatoslav Podgayevsky (born March 8, 1983) is a Russian film director and screenwriter.

Biography
Svyatoslav was born in Moscow. He worked as an editor at Gorky's studio, as a director on the NTV channel, and after that he began filming short films and clips for popular musical groups. Since 2014, he has been directing horror films.

Filmography
 Block 18 (2014)
 Queen of Spades: The Dark Rite (2015)
 The Bride (2017)
 New World (2017)
 The Mermaid: Lake of the Dead (2018)
 Baba Yaga: Terror of the Dark Forest (2020)
 Dark Spell (2021)

References

External links 
 
 Svyatoslav Podgayevsky on kino-teatr.ru

Living people
Russian film directors
1983 births